Enamorada is a 1999 telenovela co-produced by Venevisión International and Fonovideo. It is a remake of the 1988 telenovela Alba Marina.
Gaby Espino and Rene Lavan star as the main protagonists.

Plot
Eighteen years ago, Augusto's wife Rosario abandoned him and left to run off with her lover, leaving their two-year-old daughter behind. Luckily Ivana was found by a couple who raised her up as her own. Years later, Ivana has grow up into a beautiful young woman who is charming but a naive dreamer. Every day, Ivana goes to the beach to spy on Raimundo, a handsome young man who jogs there. One day, the two accidentally meet each other, and in order to impress him, Ivana goes overboard in order to impress him by exaggerating about her education and family's riches. Ivana continues to fantasize about her impending wedding to Raimundo, but soon her lies catch up with her because she doesn't realize that Raimundo is engaged to be married to Patty, her biological's father step-daughter. Also, Raimundo is the son of Esther, the woman who actually abandoned her at a stranger's home years ago. Before Rosario left with her lover, she entrusted young Ivana to Esther, but Esther was unwilling to take care of the baby. While on her trip abroad, Rosario is involved in an accident that leaves her on a wheelchair and a lost memory of her daughter or the husband she abandoned. Augusto, Ivana's real father, is married to Sonia, a rich widow who has become extremely jealous, therefore deteriorating their relationship. But he finds an opportunity to love again when she meets Cristina

Cast
Gaby Espino.....Ivana Robles
Rene Lavan.....Raimundo Alvarado
Lilibeth Morillo....Cristina Guillén
Carlos Mata....Augusto Contreras
Karina....Rosita Robles
Adolfo Cubas....Rafael Orozco. Villain, later turns good
Lili Rentería....Sonia Ascanio. Villain, paid a man to kill Rosario, suffers from cancer, repents before she dies
Carlos Cuervo....Tony Robles
Marita Capote....Rosario Morales. 
Juan Alfonso Baptista....Ricky Contreras
Flavia Gleske....Patty Parker. Villain, who loves Raimundo, hates Ivana, tried to kill her. Arrested by the police. Ends up insane asylum
Carol Barba....Jenny Rogers
Joel Núñez.....Eduardo. Good, turns villain, but repents in the end
Lady Noriega.....Laura Guzman
German Barrios.....Bartolo Robles
Lucy Orta.....Esther Alvarado. Villain, ends up jail, in the end turns good
Jose Luis Franco.....Roberto Santander
Flor de Loto.....Herminia Ascanio. Villain. Killed Leopoldo and Rosita. Arrested by the police, ends up jail.
Norma Zuñiga....Sor Angelines
Claudia Reyes....Sor Serena
Tessy Castilla.....Rosemary Villegas
Orlando Casin....Padre Rodrigo
Carolina Perdigon......Delia
Cristina Ovin.....Virginia
Pedro Rentería....Leopoldo
Juan David Ferrer....Aristides. Villain. Ends up jail.
María Camila.....Maribel. Villain
Henry Galue.....Victor Guillen
Virggi Lopez...... Raquel
Luis Alberto Garcia…. Rubén

References

External links

1999 telenovelas
1999 Venezuelan television series debuts
2000 Venezuelan television series endings
1999 American television series debuts
2000 American television series endings
Venevisión telenovelas
Univision telenovelas
Spanish-language American telenovelas
Venezuelan telenovelas
Television shows set in Miami